Muthyala Subbaiah is an Indian film director. He has directed 50 Telugu films. Known for his films with heavy dose of human emotions, he is sometimes referred as Sentiment Subbaiah.

Personal life 
Muthyala Subbaiah was born in Parlapalli, a village in Nellore district of Andhra Pradesh. His parents are Sankaraiah, Seshamma. He is the eldest of four children. He has two sisters and a brother. He was named after his grandfather Subbaiah. Their family lived on agriculture. He used to participate in stage shows since the age of 13 years. He did his B. Com from Vidavalur. He served as the secretary of Fine Arts Association in his college.

He was married to Parvathi when he was an assistant director. They have three children, two sons and a daughter.

Filmography

 Moodu Mulla Bandham (1980)
 Aruna Kiranam (1986)
 athharintiki daredi (1987)
 Nava Bharatam (1988)
 Sagatu Manishi (1988)
 Inspector Pratap (1988)
 Chinnari Sneham (1989) (Remake of Tamil film Paravaigal Palavitham)
 Mamatala Kovela (1989)
 Dharma Yuddham (1989)
 Bharatanari (1990)
 Jayasimha (1990)
 Neti Charitra (1990)
 Maa Inti Katha (1990) (Remake of Kannada film Deva)
 Mamagaru (1991) (Remake of Tamil film Naan Pudicha Mappillai)
 Samsara Veena (1991)
 Kalikalam (1991)
 Yerra Mandaram (1991)
 Bangaru Mama (1992)
 Pellante Noorella Panta (1992)
 Parvatalu Panakalu (1992)
 Repati Koduku (1992)
 Madhavayya Gari Manavadu (1992)
 Illu Pelli (1993)
 Pelli Gola (1993)
 Palnati Pourusham (1994) (Remake of Kizhakku Cheemaiyile)
 Shrivari Priyaralu (1994)
 Anna (1994)
 Ammayi Kapuram (1995)
 Errodu (1995)
 Aadaalla Majaka (1995)
 Soggadi Pellam (1996)
 Prema Prayanam (1996)
 Pavitra Bandham (1997)
 Hitler (1997)
 Oka Chinna Maata (1997)
 Gokulamlo Seeta (1997)
 Pelli Chesukundam (1997)
 Suryudu (1998)
 Snehitulu (1998)
 Pavitra Prema (1998)
 Manikyam (1999)
 Krishna Babu (1999)
 Manasunna Maaraju (2000)
 Oke Maata (2000)
 Annayya (2000)
 Tholi Valapu (2001)
 Idemi Oorura Babu (2001)
 Deevinchandi (2001)
 Raja Narasimha (2003) (Kannada)
 Aaptudu (2004)
 Aalayam (2008)

References

External links

Telugu film directors
Living people
20th-century Indian film directors
Film directors from Andhra Pradesh
People from Nellore district
21st-century Indian film directors
Year of birth missing (living people)